The 1940 Copa Aldao was the final match to decide the winner of the Copa Aldao, the 13th. edition of the international competition organised by the Argentine and Uruguayan Associations together. The final was contested by Uruguayan club Nacional and Argentine side Boca Juniors.

The match was played at Estadio Centenario in Montevideo. With Boca Juniors winning 2–1, on 88 minutes Nacional striker Atilio García forced a draw. Players of Boca Juniors protested alleging the goal had been scored after the regulatory time, but referee Tejada not only awarded the goal to Nacional but sent off Pedro Arico Suárez and coach Enrique Sobral. 

As a result, players of Boca Juniors left the field in disagreement with Tejada's decision (who reported the goal was scored on 88'). In order to define a winner, both associations, AFA and AUF, agreed to play a second match which was scheduled for January 22, 1941. Nevertheless, Boca refused to play it and no champion was crowned.

Qualified teams

Match details

References

1940 in Argentine football
a
a
a
Football in Montevideo